Alucita manneringi is a moth of the family Alucitidae. It was described by Cees Gielis in 2009. It is found in Papua New Guinea.

References

Moths described in 2009
Alucitidae
Moths of New Guinea